The Fikiotripa is a lighthouse built at the outer edge of the location of ancient Mytilene.

Description
It stands on an inclined rock and looks like a boat stranded on the rocky shore. Constructed during the 1880s,to make it easier for sailors to approach the Mytilini port as well as improve the sail between the island of Lesvos and Asia Minor.

History
It is one of the few preserved lighthouses of the North Aegean style. It was built in 1863 when the island was part of the Ottoman Empire. The light emitting components are placed on a steel rod that emerges from the building. After the Civil War it housed the Sea scouts club of Mytilene and afterwards it was used as a military outpost. The lighthouse was recently repaired and is actively used today. It is listed as a historical monument

Gallery

References

Lighthouses in Greece
Monuments and memorials in Greece
Buildings and structures in Lesbos